Kentucky Route 359 (KY 359) is a  state highway in the U.S. state of Kentucky. The highway connects rural areas of Union and Henderson counties with Morganfield and Smith Mills.

Route description
KY 359 begins at an intersection with U.S. Route 60 (US 60) in the northeastern part of Morganfield, within Union County. It travels to the northeast and leaves the city. It crosses over Lost Creek and Higginson Ditch and then intersects KY 141. It passes Highland Cemetery just before it begins a one-block concurrency with KY 1180. Then, the highway curves to the north-northeast. It curves back to the northeast and crosses over Little Mason Creek. Just over  later, it intersects the northern terminus of KY 1179. Just under  later is an intersection with the eastern terminus of KY 360. It then crosses over Highland Creek. The highway curves to the east-northeast and enters Henderson County. KY 359 curves back to the northeast and crosses over an unnamed stream. It passes Smith Mills Cemetery before it enters Smith Mills. There, it meets its northern terminus, an intersection with KY 136 (Alzey–Mt. Vernon Road).

Major intersections

See also

References

0359
Transportation in Union County, Kentucky
Transportation in Henderson County, Kentucky